Arim (also Romanized as Arīm and Areyīm) is a village in Estakhr-e Posht Rural District, Hezarjarib District, Neka County, Mazandaran Province, Iran. At the 2006 census, its population was 113, in 28 families.

References 

Populated places in Neka County